The Springfield Model 1795 was a .69 caliber flintlock musket manufactured in the late 18th and early 19th centuries in the United States.

The Model 1795 was the first musket to be produced in the United States by Eli Whitney at both the Springfield and Harpers Ferry U.S. armories. It was based heavily on the Charleville Model 1763/66 which had been imported in large numbers from the French during the American Revolution and which at the time comprised the largest number of muskets in U.S. arsenals at about 20,000 muskets. The Model 1795 was used in the War of 1812, after which shortcomings in both the design and manufacturing process of the Model 1795 led to the development of the Springfield Model 1812 at Springfield only, and eventually the Springfield Model 1816 at both armories.

Characteristics
The Model 1795, a very elongated musket, retained many of the characteristics of the Charleville on which it was based. The original version had the bayonet lug on the bottom of the barrel but this was later moved to the top. Barrels of Harpers Ferry Model 1795s were serial numbered up to some point in 1812: Model 1795's were never serial numbered. Springfield began the Model 1812 improvements in 1814, but Harpers Ferry continued on with the production of the Model 1795 until at least 1819 (early 1819 examples still used the Model 1795 lockplate) and never produced the Model 1812. Eventually, both armories incorporated improvements into the Model 1816 flintlock which were after a few years virtually identical. Most, but not all, parts will interchange on the Model 1816 muskets but the hand-crafted parts, and lack of set standards and patterns on the earlier Model 1795 weapons often means parts will not interchange easily.

The Model 1795 fired a smaller round than the British .75 caliber Brown Bess, but the Model 1795 also had both a slightly longer range and slightly better accuracy than the Brown Bess musket. This gave the American forces an advantage of range when they faced British forces in the War of 1812.

Production
The Model 1795 was manufactured at the United States Armory and Arsenal at Springfield, which was the first armory in the United States, at least as early as 1799. Earlier versions prior to this date probably were produced but were not dated. Starting in 1801, possibly as early as 1800, it was also produced in the then new United States Armory and Arsenal at Harpers Ferry.
Several differences between the Springfield Model 1795 and the Harpers Ferry Model 1795 have led many to label the Harpers Ferry version as a significantly different model. Quite a few independent contractors also made the weapon as they were in constant demand. The federal armories simply could not make enough muskets to meet demand with the labor force they had during these early years. Only about two dozen artisans worked in the Harpers Ferry arsenal around 1800, and making the muskets from raw materials was a very labor-intensive task. Approximately 80,000 Springfield Model 1795 muskets were produced while about 70,000 were produced at Harpers Ferry.

Service history
Model 1795s were used throughout the War of 1812, the Mexican–American War of 1846–48, and the American Civil War of 1861–65. Most were converted to percussion caps either at the armories or by private individuals, but records reflect that many in the South were issued an original flintlock at the beginning of the Civil War until the Confederates could convert them to percussion. There is some evidence that some were in fact never converted at all from flintlock. The effective service life of the Model 1795 thus extends through 1865.

The Model 1795 was also used by some members of the Lewis and Clark expedition.

See also
 Springfield musket

References

External links

Springfield firearms
Muskets
American Civil War weapons
Weapons of the Confederate States of America